Criquebeuf-en-Caux (literally Criquebeuf in Caux) is a commune in the Seine-Maritime department in the Normandy region in northern France.

Geography
The commune's cliffs face the English Channel.

Heraldry

Population

Places of interest
 The remains of the motte of a feudal castle.
 The church of St.Martin, dating from the sixteenth century.

See also
Communes of the Seine-Maritime department

References

Communes of Seine-Maritime